Oktyabrsky is a rural locality (a settlement) in Palnikovskoye Rural Settlement, Permsky District, Perm Krai, Russia. The population was 185 as of 2010. There are 5 streets.

Geography 
Oktyabrsky is located 200 km south of Perm (the district's administrative centre) by road. Snezhnoye is the nearest rural locality.

References 

Rural localities in Permsky District